Otto Baecker (7 January 1898 – 22 May 1970) was a German cinematographer who worked on more than seventy films between 1923 and 1958. He worked on a number of films during the Nazi era including the 1934 science fiction feature Gold.

Selected filmography
 The Lost Shoe (1923)
 The Gentleman Without a Residence (1925)
 The Flame of Love (1930)
 The Man in Search of His Murderer (1931)
 Inquest (1931)
 About an Inquest (1931)
 Storms of Passion (1932)
 A Blonde Dream (1932)
 Happy Ever After (1932)
 Quick (1932)
 The Victor (1932)
 Love Must Be Understood (1933)
 Gold (1934)
 Count Woronzeff (1934)
 The Double (1934)
The Green Domino (1935)
 The Gypsy Baron (1935)
 Winter in the Woods (1936)
 Ride to Freedom (1937)
 The Mystery of Betty Bonn (1938)
 Between the Parents (1938)
 The Right to Love (1939)
 The Master Detective (1944)
 Free Land (1946)
 Three Days of Fear (1952)
 You Only Live Once (1952)
 Christina (1953)
 Have Sunshine in Your Heart (1953)
 Such a Charade (1953)
 Lost Child 312 (1955)
 Heroism after Hours (1955)
 The Model Husband (1956)

References

Bibliography 
 Schulte-Sasse, Linda. Entertaining the Third Reich: Illusions of Wholeness in Nazi Cinema. Duke University Press, 1996.

External links 
 

1898 births
1970 deaths
German cinematographers
Film people from Berlin